Kenneth Graham Sansom (born 26 September 1958) is a former professional footballer who played as a defender. An England international, he played for clubs such as Crystal Palace, Arsenal, Newcastle United, Coventry City, Queens Park Rangers, Everton and Watford.

He is the second most capped England national team full-back, having appeared 86 times for his country between 1979 and 1988.

Club career
Kenneth Graham Sansom was born in Camberwell, London on 26 September 1958; the second youngest of five children. His father, George, was an itinerant who left the family home shortly after the birth of his youngest child. His mother, Rose, was a cleaner, and moved the family to Tulse Hill in 1960. He considered himself a goalkeeper in his early years, but while playing for a youth team called Spring Park Wolves he replaced an injured teammate at left-back, and remained a full-back for the rest of his career. He attended Beaufoy Secondary school, and was capped by England schoolboys.

Crystal Palace
Sansom was scouted by Arsenal, Queens Park Rangers and Tottenham Hotspur, but went on to join the youth team at Crystal Palace. He made his League debut against Tranmere Rovers on 7 May 1975.

In 1977, he captained the Palace junior team to FA Youth Cup success while also skippering the England youth team at the same level, collecting Palace's "Player of the Year" award in his first season.

Quick, calm, strong in the tackle and an excellent crosser of the ball, Sansom missed just one league game in a consecutive run of 156 games, starting in 1976, when Palace were in the Third Division. In the 1978–79 season Crystal Palace won the Second Division championship with Sansom integral to the young team. They were quickly labelled as the "Team of The '80s". and briefly topped the First Division at the start of the 1979–80 season although they ultimately finished in thirteenth position.

Arsenal
Arsenal put in a bid of £1 million for Sansom in the summer of 1980, with striker Clive Allen going in exchange; this was an unusual move, as Allen was an equally prized young player and had only joined Arsenal weeks earlier, and had yet to play a competitive match for the club. Palace accepted the bid and Sansom left for Highbury.

Sansom made his Arsenal debut against West Bromwich Albion on 16 August 1980 and was an ever-present for that season and the next, and a near-constant figure at left-back for Arsenal. He was bestowed with the honour of Arsenal Player of the Season in 1981. Although a third-place finish did ensure European football was back on the agenda, no real title challenge was forthcoming. The next two seasons saw a top-five finish in 1982, and a disappointing tenth in 1983 when matters were not improved by semi-final failure in both domestic cups at the hands of Manchester United. Terry Neill was sacked in December 1983 and Don Howe took over. Arsenal finished sixth and seventh under Howe and although often tipped to challenge, usually flattered to deceive. Sansom though was remarkably consistent and ever present. In fact, after six seasons Sansom missed just seven games in all competitions. He was one of the few players who could really hold up his head in a time of under-achievement. Meanwhile, silverware eluded both Sansom and Arsenal. In May 1986, Millwall manager George Graham, a former Arsenal player, was appointed as Howe’s long-term replacement, and it was the beginning of a new era of success at Highbury. Arsenal’s form immediately improved, so much so that the club were top of the League at Christmas 1986.

Sansom finally won domestic silverware in 1987, captaining Arsenal to a League Cup final victory over Liverpool at Wembley; Arsenal came from a goal down to win 2–1, with Sansom starting the move which had led to Arsenal's late winner, scored by Charlie Nicholas.

The following season, Sansom's relationship with his Arsenal manager Graham soured and he was replaced as captain by fledgling defender Tony Adams, who was just 21. Sansom did, however, keep his place in the side; although Graham had just signed a long-term replacement in Nigel Winterburn. Winterburn was played at right-back rather than left for his first season at the club. Arsenal reached the League Cup final again in 1987–88, only to lose 3–2 to Luton Town in a dramatic and exciting match. Everton away at Goodison Park on 7 May 1988 was the last time Sansom pulled on the red and white shirt.

Sansom left Arsenal in December 1988, having not played a first team game at all for the first four months of 1988–89; Graham had signed Lee Dixon and had reshuffled the side, with Dixon playing at right-back and Nigel Winterburn on the left, replacing Sansom. Sansom had played 394 matches in total for Arsenal, scoring six goals.

Later career
Arsenal sold Sansom to Newcastle United for £300,000 in December 1988. The 1988-89 season was a season of contrasting fortunes between the two clubs as Arsenal won the League Championship and his new club finished bottom of the First Division. Sansom transferred to Queens Park Rangers in the summer of 1989 for £300,000 and scored against Arsenal in a 2–0 FA Cup Fourth Round replay victory at Loftus Road. After making 64 league appearances for QPR, he moved on to Coventry City for £100,000 in March 1991 and made 51 league appearances for 'The Sky Blues'. Sansom then had short spells at Everton (seven league appearances and one goal against Tottenham Hotspur), who he joined on a free transfer in February 1993, and First Division Brentford (eight appearances), who he joined on a free transfer a month later, March 1993, but he could not prevent 'The Bees' from being relegated. After playing non-league football with Chertsey Town, Sansom returned to league football again by joining Glenn Roeder and First Division Watford, as player and first team coach. Sansom made one league appearance for Watford, before he retired from top class football, though he did play on for non-league clubs such as Croydon F.C. and Slough Town. Since retiring from the game, he has often appeared on Sky Sports as a football analyst.

International career
On 23 May 1979, Sansom made his debut for the full England team, in a goalless draw against Wales. The same summer he had starred for England in UEFA Euro 1980 in Italy, though England did not make progress. In his England career for which Sansom gained extra plaudits and recognition. He was a regular starter playing in the 1982 World Cup in Spain, in which England exited in the second group phase. He was still the first-choice left-back for the 1986 World Cup in Mexico, playing in all of the matches up to and including the quarter final defeat against Argentina, in which game he was one of the England players left behind by Diego Maradona as he burst from inside his own half to score his second goal.

Sansom missed only a handful of England matches between 1980 and 1988; his record of 37 consecutive appearances between May 1984 and April 1987 has only been bettered by Billy Wright and Ron Flowers. He was occasionally rested in friendly matches so that coaches Ron Greenwood and then Bobby Robson could check on potential replacements Derek Statham, Alan Kennedy, Nick Pickering and Stuart Pearce in the event of Sansom's suffering from either serious injury or chronic loss of form. However Sansom was still the regular left-back during England's UEFA Euro 1988 qualifying campaign.

That summer, Sansom was Robson's first-choice left-back for the European Championships, but England lost all three of their group games, starting with a surprise 1–0 defeat to the Republic of Ireland in their first ever finals match, having qualified under the management of Englishman and World Cup winner Jack Charlton.

Sansom made an error for the only goal of the game, toeing an attempted clearance high into the air and putting pressure on his fellow defenders, from which John Aldridge won a header for Ray Houghton to nod the ball past Peter Shilton. Sansom played in the other two group fixtures but after the tournament Stuart Pearce replaced him as England's first-choice left-back. After nine consecutive years, Sansom's international career was coming to a close, months before his 30th birthday. He was briefly recalled to the side in 1989 as a back-up when Pearce was injured, though he did not play. In all Sansom gained 86 caps with one goal which was scored in a 1984 World Cup qualifier against Finland.

Sansom is England's second-most capped full-back and only eleven players have appeared more times for England than Sansom. Among these are David Beckham, Bobby Moore, Steven Gerrard, Bobby Charlton, Bryan Robson, Frank Lampard, Michael Owen and Wayne Rooney and Peter Shilton. Jointly with Shilton, Sansom also holds the record for the most England caps in the 1980s, with 84 in all.

Later life
After playing, Sansom fell on hard financial times with business problems, gambling problems and alcoholism. Sansom returned to football as a player on the veterans' circuit. He was frequently called upon as a pundit to make comments on the game, especially with matters concerning Crystal Palace or Arsenal. He also made occasional appearances on Australian football show Fox Sports FC via satellite. He was also a tour guide on the "Legend's Tour" of Arsenal's Emirates Stadium.

He was a co-presenter of LBC Radio's Saturday afternoon football programme. Sansom was voted into Palace's Centenary XI.

On 7 February 2014, Sansom appeared at court in Bromley, charged with assault following an alleged incident at his former partner's property. He was cleared of all charges.

In 2016, Sansom was a guest on "Thursday Focus" on Manchester United's in-house TV channel, MUTV, discussing his career and his life after football.

In May 2020 he was reportedly in hospital with an undisclosed illness. It was revealed 6 months later that he was diagnosed with Wernicke-Korsakoff syndrome, a type of dementia.

Career statistics

Honours
Crystal Palace
 FA Youth Cup: 1977
 Football League Second Division: 1978–79

Arsenal
 Football League Cup: 1986–87

England
 British Home Championship: 1981–82, 1982–83

Individual
 Crystal Palace Player of the Year: 1977, 1979
 Arsenal Player of the Season: 1980−81
 PFA Third Division Team of the Year: 1976–77
 PFA Second Division Team of the Year: 1977–78, 1978–79
 PFA First Division Team of the Year (8): 1979–80, 1980–81, 1981–82, 1982–83, 1983–84, 1984–85, 1985–86, 1986–87

References
General
 

Specific

1958 births
Living people
Footballers from Camberwell
English footballers
Association football fullbacks
Crystal Palace F.C. players
Arsenal F.C. players
Newcastle United F.C. players
Queens Park Rangers F.C. players
Coventry City F.C. players
Everton F.C. players
Brentford F.C. players
Watford F.C. players
English Football League players
Premier League players
England schools international footballers
England under-21 international footballers
England B international footballers
England international footballers
UEFA Euro 1980 players
1982 FIFA World Cup players
1986 FIFA World Cup players
UEFA Euro 1988 players
Croydon F.C. players